Stronger Than Ever may refer to:

Albums
Stronger Than Ever (album), by Grave Digger, or the title song, 1986
Stronger Than Ever (EP), by Raised Fist, or the title song, 1996
Stronger Than Ever, by Killer, 1983
Stronger Than Ever, by Rose Royce, 1982

Songs
"Stronger Than Ever" (Raleigh Ritchie song), 2014
"Stronger Than Ever", by Christina Aguilera from Bionic, 2010

Other uses
Stronger Than Ever, a Thoroughbred racehorse, winner of the 2018 Silverbulletday Stakes